The Army Air Forces Proving Ground Command (AAF PGC) was the primary testing command of the United States Army Air Forces (1946-47), and then the United States Air Force (1947-57).

In March 1946, the Army Air Forces Center was redesignated the AAF PGC, adding the responsibilities of a similarly named organization in June, when it moved to Eglin Field, Florida.  It became the Army Air Forces' (later the United States Air Force's) primary testing command (except for a brief period in 1948, when it was part of Air Materiel Command) until 1957. In 1957 the PGC was redesignated the Air Proving Ground Center and re-assigned to Air Research and Development Command (ARDC). The APGC continued its mission thereafter as part of the ARDC.

From 27 October 1942, the School of Applied Tactics, later the AAF Tactical Center and then the AAF Center, was stationed at Orlando Army Air Base, Florida. The Centre was redesignated the AAF PGC on 8 March 1946 and, the same day, re-stationed to 
Eglin Field (later Air Force Base), Florida. It remained at Eglin AFB thereafter. 

On 1 October 1998, the Air Force Development Test Center, as it had become, was redesignated the Air Armament Center. The Air Armament Center continued to carry out its tasks until it was inactivated on 1 October 2012.

Lineage
 Established as Army Air Forces School of Applied Tactics on 27 October 1942, with major command status
 Redesignated: Army Air Forces Tactical Center on 16 October 1943
 Redesignated: Army Air Forces Center on 1 June 1945
 Redesignated: Army Air Forces Proving Ground Command on 8 March 1946
 Redesignated: Air Proving Ground Command on 10 July 1946
 Redesignated: Air Proving Ground on 20 January 1948
 Redesignated: Air Proving Ground Command on 29 December 1951
 Redesignated: Air Proving Ground Center on 1 December 1957
 Redesignated: Armament Development and Test Center on 1 August 1968
 Redesignated: Armament Division on 1 October 1979
 Redesignated: Munitions Systems Division on 15 March 1989
 Redesignated: Air Force Development Test Center on 11 July 1990
 Redesignated: Air Armament Center on 1 October 1998
 Inactivated on 1 October 2012

Assignments 
 United States Army Air Forces, 27 October 1942
 Air Materiel Command, 20 January 1948
 United States Air Force, 1 June 1948
 Air Research and Development Command (later Air Force Systems Command), 1 December 1957
 Air Force Materiel Command, 1 July 1992 – 1 October 2012 (attached to Air Force Life Cycle Management Center after 18 July 2012)

Components 
 Division
 Air Force Division, Joint Long Range Proving Ground, 1 December 1949 – 14 May 1951

 Wings
 550th Guided Missiles Wing, 20 July 1949 – 1 December 1950
 3200th Maintenance Wing (later 3200th Test Wing), 1 July 1953 – 24 October 1955
 3200th Proof Test Wing, 1 April 1951 – 1 July 1952
 3201st Air Base Wing, 1 April 1951 – 1 July 1957
 3202d Installations Wing, 1 July 1953 – unknown
 3206th Support Wing (later 3206th Test Wing, 1 July 1953 – 1 July 1957

 Groups
 1st Experimental Guided Missiles Group, 6 February 1946 – 20 July 1949
 3200th Proof Test Group (see 3200 Headquarters Squadron)

 Squadrons
 3200 Headquarters Squadron (later 3200th Proof Test Group), 1 July 1948 – 1 April 1951, 1 July 1952 – 1 July 1953
 3201 Headquarters Squadron (later 3201 Air Base Group), 1 July 1948 – 1 April 1951

 Base units
 600th AAF Base Unit (later 600th AF Base Unit), 1 October 1947 – 9 July 1948
 604th AF Base Unit, 16 January 1948 – 9 July 1948
 605th AAF Base Unit (later 600th AF Base Unit), 1 October 1947 – 9 July 1948
 607th AAF Base Unit (later 600th AF Base Unit), 1 October 1947 – 9 July 1948
 609th AAF Base Unit (Airdrome Group) later 600th AF Base Unit), 1 January 1947 – 9 July 1948
 610th AAF Base Unit (Proving Ground Complement, later Flight Test), 1 June 1946 – 1 August 1947
 611th AAF Base Unit (Flight Test) (later 600th AF Base Unit (Proof Test Group)), 1 June 1946 – 9 July 1948
 612th AAF Base Unit (Fixed Gunnery School), 1 June 1946 – 31 December 1946
 615th AAF Base Unit, 1 August 1946 – 31 December 1946
 902d AAF Base Unit (Facilities), 15 June 1946 – 20 Jul 1946
 999th AAF Base Unit (AAF Tactical Applications Center), 1 June 1946 – 31 December 1946

References

Bibliography 

 
 

Test and evaluation units and formations of the United States Air Force
Major commands of the United States Air Force
Military units and formations established in 1946